The Actor Tour is the second tour by American musician and singer-songwriter St. Vincent. The tour centered on her second album, Actor (2009). The tour began in the Great American Music Hall in 2009 and concluded at Teatro de la Ciudad in 2010.

Opening acts
Pattern Is Movement 
Wildbirds and Peacedrums

Opened for
Andrew Bird
Grizzly Bear

Touring members
Anthony LaMarca (2009–2010) – Drums, Sampler
Daniel Hart (2009–10) – Violin, Guitar, Vocals
Evan Smith (2009–10) – Flute, Clarinet, Saxophone, Keyboards, Vocals
William Flynn (2009-Beginning of 2010) – Bass, Vocals, Clarinet
Andrew Carlson (End of 2010) – Bass, Vocals, Clarinet

Songs performed

Tour dates

Notes

References

2009 concert tours
2010 concert tours
St. Vincent (musician) concert tours